Abell 1795 is a galaxy cluster in the Abell catalogue.

Black holes 
In January 2014,  Chandra X-Ray Observatory claimed to have made discovery of a new supermassive black hole candidate disrupting star in the Abell 1795.

See also
 Abell catalogue
 List of Abell clusters

References

1795
Galaxy clusters
Abell richness class 2
Boötes